Farista is a former unincorporated community in Huerfano County, Colorado, United States that has been annexed into Walsenburg. The U.S. Post Office at Walsenburg (ZIP Code 81089) now serves Farista postal addresses.

Annexation by Walsenburg
The area referred to as Farista on Google maps and other recent online sources was annexed by the City of Walsenburg in 2008 and is considered to be the Northlands neighborhood of the city. The name Farista is not used in any official context by Walsenburg or by Huerfano County (Northlands is used instead), nor do locals refer to the area as Farista.

Name
The name was taken from the Lebanese Faris family of the Faris Land and Cattle Co. who owned much of the land in the area in the early to mid 20th century.
References to Farista are often typographical errors concerning the actual town of Farisita, Colorado (named after the same Faris family) which is also in Huerfano county near Gardner. One example is a Colorado State University Werner College of Natural Resources report called Survey of Critical Wetland Resources in Huerfano County  from 2017 which interchanges Farista with Farisita frequently.

References

External links

Huerfano County, Colorado